Indre is a landlocked department in central France named after the river Indre. The inhabitants of the department are known as the Indriens (masculine) and Indriennes (feminine). Indre is part of the current administrative region of Centre-Val de Loire and is bordered by the departments of Indre-et-Loire to the west, Loir-et-Cher to the north, Cher to the east, Creuse, and Haute-Vienne to the south, and Vienne to the southwest. The préfecture (capital) is Châteauroux and there are three subpréfectures at Le Blanc, La Châtre and Issoudun. It had a population of 219,316 in 2019.

History

Indre is one of the original 83 departments created during the French Revolution on 4 March 1790, by order of the National Constituent Assembly. The new departments were to be uniformly administered and approximately equal in size and population to one another. The department was created from parts of the former provinces of Berry, Orléanais, La Marche and Touraine.

Before the Roman conquest, the Celtic Bituriges tribe occupied an area that included Indre, Cher, and part of Limousin. Their capital was Avaricum (Bourges), and another important settlement was at Argenton-sur-Creuse. The area then became part of Roman Gaul after its conquest by Julius Caesar around 58 BC, and enjoyed a period of stability. Following the collapse of the Roman Empire in the West, the Frankish tribes living in Gaul were united under the Merovingians, and succeeded in conquering most of the country in the sixth century AD. From this time, the Franks controlled most of Gaul and the Carolingian Empire was the last stage of their rule. The Carolingian dynasty reached its peak with the crowning of Charlemagne and after his death in 814, it began to fragment. The Carolingian territories were divided into three sections in 843 at the Treaty of Verdun, and the area that is now the department of Indre, became part of West Francia. In 869, the king of Middle Francia died without leaving a legitimate heir, and eventually part of that kingdom was added to West Francia to effectively form the medieval Kingdom of France.

A castle was built at Châteauroux in the late tenth century. In the eleventh century, the lords of Châteauroux were powerful in the region; their "principality" covered two thirds of the current Department of Indre and they had their own coinage.

Geography
Indre is a department in central France and is part of the region of Centre-Val de Loire. The capital and largest town in the department is Châteauroux. To the north of Indre lies Loir-et-Cher, to the east Cher, to the south lies Creuse and Haute-Vienne, to the southwest lies Vienne, and to the northwest lies Indre-et-Loire. Most of the department is relatively level plains in the broad Loire Valley.

The land is undulating and slopes gently towards the northwest. The main rivers are the Creuse, the Claise and the Indre. The Indre is a longer waterway and flows centrally through the department from south to north, through the major towns of La Châtre, Châteauroux and Loches. It is a tributary of the Loire, joining it at Chinon in the neighbouring department of Loir-et-Cher.

The remaining land is heathland, urban land and waterways.

The economy is mostly agricultural. In the past many sheep were raised in the department and woollen yarn was the main manufactured product. There is also a linen industry as well as the manufacture of hosiery and paper. The department has some minerals in the form of coal, iron, stone, marble and clay.

Demographics

Principal towns

The most populous commune is Châteauroux, the prefecture. As of 2019, there are 5 communes with more than 5,000 inhabitants:

Politics
The President of the Departmental Council is Marc Fleuret of the Union of Democrats and Independents.

Current National Assembly Representatives

Tourism
Châteauroux, the capital of the department, is a historic town. It was originally called "Château Raoul", the present day château which now houses the préfecture being built on the site of a castle constructed in the tenth century by Raoul le Large, lord of Déols. In 1188 the castle was held by Philippe Auguste who was concerned in protecting the drapery business centred in the town and along the banks of the River Indre from fraud. From 1612 to 1736 it was a duchy of the House of Condé and from 1742 to 1744 was under the control of the Marquise de la Tournelle. 
The Indre department has two villages which have been classified among the most beautiful villages of France: Saint-Benoît-du-Sault and Gargilesse-Dampierre.

See also
Cantons of the Indre department
Communes of the Indre department
Arrondissements of the Indre department

References

External links

  Prefecture website
  Departmental Council website

 
  Indre Nature

 
1790 establishments in France
Departments of Centre-Val de Loire
States and territories established in 1790